The Northern Reaches Restoration Group is a waterway society in Lancashire and Cumbria, England, UK. The purpose of the NRRG is to campaign for the re-opening of the final 14-mile stretch of the Lancaster Canal between Tewitfield Locks and Kendal. The Northern Reaches, as they are so named, became isolated from the rest of the canal following the construction of the M6 motorway in the 1960s. The navigation authority for the waterway is the Canal & River Trust, formerly British Waterways.

Background
By the 1940s large parts of the British canal network had begun to be abandoned as freight moved on to road transport. The northern part of the Lancaster Canal was no exception, with certain sections being filled in and other parts allowed to drain (dewater). While the canal between Preston and Tewitfield remained classed as a "cruising waterway", the Northern Reaches was deemed to be "remainder waterway" (i.e. obsolete) following a 1955 Act of Parliament. Despite some local opposition, highway engineers building the UK's new motorway system therefore had little interest in protecting the permanent way of the canal; construction of embankments and a culvert completely blocked the original route.

Purpose

Since the 1960s, the Lancaster Canal Trust and the Inland Waterways Association recognised the value of preserving inland waterways. Both groups lobbied for the restoration of this northern stretch of canal to navigable standard. In the 1990s the NRRG was specifically formed to continue the campaign for the waterway's  restoration.

These aims include increasing awareness and promoting interest amongst local communities and all potential users (boaters, walkers, cyclists, and anglers) of the historic waterway.

The NRRG is also committed to maintaining the surviving canal infrastructure found along the route of the Northern Reaches. As a result of its efforts, many of the original structures have been protected, further loss to cruising waterway has halted, and improvements have been made to the towpath by erecting interpretative panels at various sites along the disused canal.

Restoration partnership
The NRRG is part of the Lancaster Canal Restoration Partnership based at Levens Hall, Kendal. This is an umbrella organisation that brings together all organisations that support the canal's restoration. They are:
Canal & River Trust
Cumbria County Council
Inland Waterways Association
Kendal Town Council
Lancashire County Council
Lancaster Canal Trust
Lancaster City Council
South Lakeland District Council
Waterways Trust
Additional support is provided by the Waterway Recovery Group.

See also

List of waterway societies in the United Kingdom
Preston City Link Canal Trust
Ribble Link
Ribble Link Trust
River Lune
Lune aqueduct

External links
South Lakeland Local Plan (extract): support for NRRG
South Lakeland District council, representation on the Northern Reaches Restoration Group
Inland Waterways Advisory Council, list of restoration projects
North West Regional Development Agency confirms funding
Northern Reaches website

Waterways organisations in England
Lancaster Canal